Alejandro Rossi (Alessandro Rossi; September 22, 1932 – June 5, 2009) was born in Florence, Italy of Venezuelan mother and Italian father) was an Italian-Venezuelan writer.

Alejandro Rossi wrote philosophical essays, short stories and the following books: Lenguaje y significado (Language and Meaning) (Siglo XXI, 1968, FCE, 1995, 7th edition); Manual del Distraído Manual of the Absent-minded (J. Mortiz, 1978, Anagrama, 1980, Monte Avila, 1987, FCE, 1992, 6th edition); Sueños de Occam (Occam's Dreams) (UNAM, 1982); La fábula de Las Regiones (the Fable of The Regions) (El Equilibrista, 1989), Edén: Vida imaginada (FCE, 2006). Ortega y Gasset in collaboration (FCE, 1984); he edited José Gaos' Anthology: Filosofía de la Filosofía (Philosophy of Philosophy) (Crítica, 1989). Rossi won the Premio Nacional de Lingüística y Literatura (National Literary and Linguistics Prize) in 1999.

Rossi's writing is marked by a rich language that plays with generic definitions.

Independent and Collaborative Works 
Rossi was co-founder and co-director of the Hispanic-American magazine Crítica ("Criticism"). He was also a member of the editing board for the magazine Plural and acted as the interim director for the magazine Vuelta. In 1983, Rossi was invited to attend St. Anthony's College in University of Oxford in Great Britain. Then in 1989, Rossi edited and wrote the foreword for the anthology José Gaos: Filosofía de la Filosofía ("José Gaos: The Philosophy of Philosophy") (Crítica) and also collaborated with various foreign others in books like Philosophie und Rechtstheorie in Mexiko (Duncker & Humblot, Berlín, 1989) and Philosophical Analysis in Latin America (Jorge J. E. Gracia et al., 1984). Some of his other well-known works include Manual del Distraído ("Manual of the Distracted") (1978), La Fábula de las Regiones ("The Legend of the Regions") (1997), and Lenguaje y significado ("Language and Meaning") (1968). On the same note, in a volume written in collaboration with other authors (FCE, 1984, 1996), Rossi paid homage to one of mainstays of his form of thought, José Ortega and Gasset.

In addition to his work for Plural, Rossi also wrote supplemental articles on culture for the newspaper Excélsior which, at the time, was headed by the poet Octavio Paz and under the editorship of Julio Scherer García. In 1976, the newspaper was subdued by members of the Institutional Revolutionary Party (PRI) led by Luis Echeverría Álvarez (1970-1976) -- due to the newspaper's views against his administration—leaving Rossi to follow Paz and his coworkers in founding the literary review Vuelta of which Rossi served as the interim director for a few months. From there, Rossi became part of the review's editing board until the very last day of publication. Vuelta received the Prince of Asturias Award (Spanish: Premio Príncipe de Asturias de Comunicación y Humanidades) in 1993.

References

1932 births
Mexican male writers
20th-century Mexican philosophers
Members of El Colegio Nacional (Mexico)
Mexican people of Italian descent
Mexican people of Venezuelan descent
2009 deaths